Black Mountain is a large hill in Presque Isle County, Michigan. Located 11 miles north of Onaway, Michigan, the mountain is a popular recreational activity site and is part of the state-owned Black Mountain Forest Recreation Area, which is operated by the Michigan Department of Natural Resources.

History
Black Mountain and the range in which it is situated were created by the glacial movement of the last major ice age. Nearby, Woodland Lake was also created by these glaciers. The area was inhabited by Native Americans until around 1800, when settlers from New England established "Ore Creek," which later became known as "Brighton." Gradually, the areas around Black Mountain have been developed. The Brighton area is now home to over 7000 people; Black Mountain lies in a residential zone of varying density. Due to deforestation, erosion has become an increasingly severe problem on parts of the mountain.

Beginning in the 1990s, the property around Black Mountain was developed; this process continues today. The road next to the mountain was extended. To date, two houses have been built at the base of the mountain. In addition, several lots surrounding the mountain are currently for sale. The owners of the mountain have donated the land to the state of Michigan and it is now a state park.

Geography and climate
Black Mountain was created by glaciers in the last major ice age. The range is characterized by medium to steep grade, with deep valleys and high peaks.

The area experiences a four-season temperate climate, with cold winters and hot summers. The largest amounts of precipitation occur in the months of December and January, while July and August are the driest. The typical winter season begins in November and lasts well into March. July highs are 75 to 85 degrees, and lows are 55 to 65 degrees.

Skiing
Special pathways have been constructed for the traditional diagonal skier and the skate-skier. Pathways range from "Easy" to "Most Difficult".

Skiers may find themselves gliding under majestic pines, taking in views of Black Lake and, under the right conditions, even getting a glimpse of Lake Huron. Trail users travel through a number of forest types and are able to see what a managed forest looks like in its various stages of regrowth. Four separate parking lots provide skiers and hikers access to the pathway loops which best suit their abilities or interests.

Other attractions
There are multiple trails going around Black Mountain and through it. All terrain vehicles (ATVs) and dirt bike enthusiasts will find plenty to be excited about. In addition to the winding trails and generally straight routes, there is a  scramble area for motorcycles and ATVs. (This area is closed to 4X4 trucks). Legal access to trails, routes and the scramble area is at the upper level of Black Lake Campground. The network of paths throughout the mountain, while most often used for dirt biking, are also used for mountain biking, unicycling, and other similar sports. During the winter season, the paths on the mountain are a popular attraction for area snowmobilers.

References

External links
 Black Mountain Forest Recreation Area - official site 
 Black Mountain - activities listing

Landforms of Presque Isle County, Michigan
Mountains of Michigan
Protected areas of Presque Isle County, Michigan
State parks of Michigan